How High is a 2001 American stoner comedy film starring Method Man and Redman, written by Dustin Lee Abraham, and director Jesse Dylan's debut feature film.

In the film, Redman and Method Man portray two cannabis users who are visited by the ghost of a deceased friend after smoking his ashes. The ghost helps with their exams, and they receive scholarships to Harvard University. The film received generally negative reviews.

Plot

Two underachieving potheads, Silas (Method Man) and Jamal (Redman) are visited by the ghost of Silas's recent deceased friend Ivory (Chuck Deezy). Ivory was cremated and Silas used his ashes as fertilizer for a new batch of marijuana. While sitting in the parking lot before taking their "THC" (Testing for Higher Credentials, a parody of the SAT and an allusion to tetrahydrocannabinol) exams for college, Silas has his marijuana but no cigar while Jamal has a cigar but nothing left to smoke, leading them to team up in Silas's car.

They soon discover that smoking Silas's new batch summons the ghost of the recently deceased Ivory, visible to just the two of them. Ivory tells them the test answers as they take the test and they both score perfect scores. Several dubious colleges offer the pair scholarships, but none of them are appealing. Eventually, Chancellor Huntley (Fred Willard) suggests the two apply to Harvard University.

Once there, they meet Bart (Chris Elwood), captain of the rowing team, his girlfriend Lauren (Lark Voorhies), I Need Money (Al Shearer), and their roommates Jeffrey (Justin Urich) and Tuan (Trieu Tran). Once they are settled in, they visit Dean Carl Cain (Obba Babatundé) who tells them that per the terms of their scholarship, they must maintain a minimum grade point average of 2.0 in order to remain, or else face expulsion.

Jamal joins the rowing team hoping to outrank Bart. Silas enrolls in a botany class to develop his "herbal" skills, and they both enroll in black history. Throughout the semester, they pass every test with the help of Ivory. Silas continues to woo and study with Lauren, while Jamal dates the U.S. vice president's (Jeffrey Jones) daughter Jamie (Essence Atkins).

Also during the first half of the semester, they pull pranks and steal, which angers Bart, Jeffrey (who is pledging for a Final Club), and Dean Cain. Things go downhill after Silas and Jamal's raucous Halloween party. At the party, Gerald (T. J. Thyne), the volunteer officer whose bicycle was stolen and crushed by I Need Money, steals and smokes the Ivory plant, leaving the pair without access to Ivory.

Silas begins working on a truth serum for his Botany class, using plant extracts. Silas concludes that, if his experiment works, he will earn an A in Botany, and a guarantee of a next semester. His experiment fails numerous times. Before midterms Jamal suggests they go to a graveyard, dig up a "smart dead guy", and smoke his remains which they attempted to do so with John Quincy Adams. Whereas Silas suggests simply that they study hard for a few hours a day while high. They try Silas's plan, but it does not pan out, as they end up failing almost all of their midterm exams.

Desperate to stay in Harvard, they try Jamal's plan, but it proves fruitless, as well. Meanwhile, Gerald, who has morphed into a complete stoner, sees Ivory during one of his binges, and, at Ivory's behest, returns the remnants of the Ivory plant to Jamal and Silas. Due to Gerald's abuse of the plant very little remains and Jamal and Silas continue to fail their classes, which pleases Dean Cain.

With the last final exam approaching, Jamal and Silas resign themselves to give up. However, Jeffrey reminds Silas of his guarantee of another semester if he can successfully fix his truth serum experiment. Silas ultimately does, having found a solution in which the last of Ivory's leaves could be used to counteract nausea.

Nonetheless, because of their low grades, Jamal and Silas do not receive an invitation to the Harvard Alumni party. Dean Cain, clearly thrilled with this result, tells Bart he does not have to worry about the pair showing up or staying in Harvard. However, that changes when Jamie invites them both as her dates, as her father is an alumnus. At the party, Silas makes things a bit more interesting by testing out his truth serum experiment, which proves successful.

At Lauren's presentation at the alumni party of Benjamin Franklin's artifacts, she shocks everyone with her discovery: the artifacts turn out to be a bong. Ivory even shows up with Benjamin Franklin to confirm the bong's authenticity. Dean Cain is outraged by this finding, but the Chancellor decides that he has had it with the Dean and fires him. Jamal and Silas are proud that the serum worked, a celebration that was almost short-lived, as Dean Cain returns and unsuccessfully attempts to kill them both with an axe as revenge. He is eventually apprehended by Secret Service. At the end, Jamal and Silas are able to stay, Jamal and Jamie get approval of Jamie's father to date, and Lauren leaves Bart for Silas because Bart "can't satisfy her".

Cast
 Method Man as Silas P. Silas
 Redman as Jamal King
 Obba Babatundé as Dean Carl Cain
 Melissa Peterman as Sheila Cain
 Mike Epps as "Baby Powder"
 Anna Maria Horsford as Mamma King
 Fred Willard as Phil Huntley
 Jeffrey Jones as The Vice President
 Héctor Elizondo as Bill, The Crew Coach
 Lark Voorhies as Lauren
 Al Shearer as "I Need Money"
 Chuck Deezy as Ivory
 Essence Atkins as Jamie
 Chris Elwood as Bart
 T. J. Thyne as Gerald
 Trieu Tran as Tuan
 Justin Urich as Jeffrey
 Spalding Gray as Professor Jackson
 Tracy Morgan as Commercial Actor / Field of Dreams Guy (uncredited)
 Cypress Hill as Themselves
 Amber Smith as Professor Garr
 Chuck Liddell as Himself In The Party Fight Scene
 Pat Finn as Army Recruiter
 Garrett Morris as Canned Pork Chop Commercial Pitchman Along With Tracy Morgan
 Judah Friedlander as The Bicyclist
 Dennison Samaroo as Amir
 Tracey Walter as Professor Wood
 Patricia Fisher as "End Table Ass"
 Sacha Kemp as "Hella Back"
 Scruncho as "Baby Wipes"

Reception
On review aggregator Rotten Tomatoes, the film has an approval rating of 26% based on 57 reviews, with an average rating of 3.9/10. The website's critical consensus reads, "How High is a sloppily constructed stoner movie filled with lame, vulgar jokes." On Metacritic, the film received a score of 29 based on 21 reviews, indicating "generally unfavorable reviews".

Mike Clark of USA Today gave the film two and a half stars out of four. He concluded that it did not have enough material "to sustain its 91 minutes" but did have enough "low-grade laughs" for its target audience.

Writing for the San Francisco Chronicle, Bob Graham noted that "It looks like a movie somebody hallucinated and put up on the screen". He praised some humorous scenes such as the exhumation of John Quincy Adams, but criticized an abrupt ending.

Entertainment Weekly rated it third in their "Best Stoner Movie" top ten list. It also won the Stony Award for Best Stoner Movie in 2002.

Soundtrack
 How High (soundtrack)

Sequel

In October 2008, Redman revealed that a script for the sequel was in the middle of being written, stating that "we wanna represent all the smokers", believing that since How High, no one has done justice on a stoner film. In April 2009, it was reported that Redman blames Universal Pictures for the film's delay, stating: "They're not opening that money door for us to shoot it. We promoted the shit out of that movie. We got the whole world waiting for a How High 2."
 
In December 2010, Redman confirmed that Universal Pictures is indeed holding the rights to How High, so the chances of How High 2 coming out are slim. In April 2013, Method Man told TMZ that the script was being written by Dustin Lee Abraham, who wrote the first one, but it all would depend on Universal if the film would happen.
 
In November 2015, Redman stated How High 2 would be released in 2017.
 
In 2017, there was a written script, confirmed by Matt "M-80" Markoff. Redman stated that the script is being "rewritten" because he did not like the script. He expects production to begin late 2017, early 2018. In November 2017, Redman said that if the draft is not as funny as the original draft, he and Method Man would move on to something other than the sequel. Redman has confirmed that him and Method Man are not reprising their roles in the sequel because "the business wasn't right".
 
The sequel has been greenlit by MTV and Universal 1440 Entertainment as of June 25, 2018. The film takes place in Atlanta.
 
Production started as of September 25, 2018. The film stars Lil' Yachty and DC Young Fly. It was released on DVD, Blu-ray and Digital HD in 2019. 
 	
On March 7, 2019, MTV announced that the film How High 2 would premiere on April 20, 2019, 420 Day, and that Mike Epps would reprise as Baby Powder. They also released the opening credits sequence.

References

External links
 
 
 
 

2001 films
2000s buddy comedy films
American buddy comedy films
American teen comedy films
2000s English-language films
American films about cannabis
Films directed by Jesse Dylan
Films produced by Danny DeVito
Films set in Harvard University
Films set in universities and colleges
Films set in 2002
Universal Pictures films
African-American comedy films
Stoner films
2001 directorial debut films
2001 comedy films
Cultural depictions of Benjamin Franklin
Cultural depictions of John Quincy Adams
2000s American films